The 1951 Preakness Stakes was the 76th running of the $110,245 Preakness Stakes horse race for three-year-old Thoroughbreds. The second leg of the U.S. Triple Crown series, the event took place on May 19, 1951. Owned by Isabel Dodge Sloane's Brookmeade Stable and ridden by future U.S. Racing Hall of Fame inductee, Eddie Arcaro, Bold easily won the race by seven lengths over runner-up Counterpoint. The race was run on a track rated fast in a final time of 1:56 2/5.

For jockey Arcaro, the win was a record fourth time he had won the race.

Payout 
The 75th Preakness Stakes Payout Schedule

The full chart 
Daily Racing Form Charts

 Winning Breeder: Brookmeade Stud; (VA)
 Times: 1/4 mile – 0:23 0/0; 1/2 mile – 47 4/5; 3/4 mile – 1:11 2/5; mile – 1:37 2/5; 1 3/16 (final) – 1:56 2/5
 Track condition: fast

References

External links 
 

1951
Pimlico Race Course
1951 in horse racing
1951 in American sports
1951 in sports in Maryland
Horse races in Maryland